The flag of the Orange Free State was officially used from 1857 to 1902.  It was superseded by the flag of the Orange River Colony.

History
When the Orange Free State became an independent republic in February 1854, the government hoisted a red, white and blue flag. Details of the exact design have been lost, but it was presumably similar to the contemporary flag of the Netherlands. It was evidently intended as a temporary flag, as the first State President, Josias Philip Hoffman asked King Willem III of the Netherlands (r. 1849–1890) to give the new state which bore the Dutch royal family's name a flag and coat of arms. The king graciously agreed.  

A flag and coat of arms were designed by the Hoge Raad van Adel. They duly arrived in the Orange Free State in January 1856, and the Volksraad (legislature) resolved on 28 February 1856 that "the design of the flag sent by the King of the Netherlands shall be adopted".  It was officially taken into use a year later, on 23 February 1857, the third anniversary of the republic.   

It was used until the republic came to an end on 31 May 1902.

The flag was later incorporated into the design of the national flag of South Africa (from 1928 to 1994) and used by the Anglo-Boer War Museum and the Voortrekker Monument.

The flag also appears in the music video of the Afrikaans song De la Rey by Bok van Blerk.

Description
The flag consisted of seven horizontal bands of white (4) and orange (3), with the Dutch flag in the canton.

See also
 Coat of arms of the Orange Free State
 List of South African flags
 Flag of the Cape Colony
 Flag of Goshen
 Flag of Natal
 Flag of the Natalia Republic
 Flag of the Orange River Colony
 Flag of South Africa
 Flag of the South African Republic
 Flag of Stellaland
 Flag of Transvaal

References

Sources
 Brownell, F.G. (1993).  National and Provincial Symbols.
 Burgers, A.P. (1997).  Sovereign Flags over Southern Africa.
 Burgers, A.P. (2008).  The South African Flag Book.
 Pama, C. (1965).  Lions and Virgins.

Flags of South Africa
South African heraldry
Historical flags
Flag of the Orange Free State
1857 introductions